Bob Vanatta (July 7, 1918 – October 22, 2016) was an American basketball coach and college athletics administrator.  He served as the head basketball coach for Central Methodist, Missouri State University, Army, Bradley, Memphis State, Missouri, and Delta State University.  At Missouri State, he won the 1952 and 1953 NAIA Championships.  At Memphis State, he compiled a 109-34 record, including making it to the 1957 NIT Championship game.  After coaching, he later served as athletic director at Oral Roberts University, commissioner of the Ohio Valley Conference, commissioner of the Atlantic Sun Conference, executive director of the Independence Bowl, athletic director at Louisiana Tech University, commissioner of the Sunshine State Conference, president of the NCAA Division II Conference Commissioner's Association, and associate athletic director at Florida Atlantic University.  He was a member of the Palm Beach County Sports Commission, which presents the Lou Groza Award to the nation's top placekicker.

Vanatta died October 22, 2016, aged 98, in Melbourne, Florida.

Head coaching record

References

1918 births
2016 deaths
American men's basketball coaches
American men's basketball players
Army Black Knights men's basketball coaches
Basketball coaches from Missouri
Basketball players from Missouri
Bradley Braves athletic directors
Bradley Braves men's basketball coaches
Central Methodist Eagles football coaches
Central Methodist Eagles men's basketball coaches
Central Methodist Eagles men's basketball players
College football bowl executives
Delta State Statesmen basketball coaches
Louisiana Tech Bulldogs and Lady Techsters athletic directors
Memphis Tigers men's basketball coaches
Missouri State Bears basketball coaches
Missouri Tigers men's basketball coaches
Ohio Valley Conference commissioners
Oral Roberts Golden Eagles athletic directors
Sportspeople from Columbia, Missouri